The Naschmarkt is Vienna's most popular market.

The Naschmarkt has existed since the 16th century when mainly milk bottles were sold (as milk bottles were made out of ash (wood from an ash tree), "Asch" (German for "ash") led to the name "Aschenmarkt"). From 1793 onwards, all fruits and vegetables brought to Vienna with carts had to be sold there, while goods arriving on the Danube were sold elsewhere. Nowadays, one can buy fresh fruit and vegetables from around the world, exotic herbs, cheese, baked goods such as bread, kaiser rolls, torte, meats, and seafood. There are also many small restaurants which offer e.g. sushi, kebab, seafood, traditional Viennese food such as Kaiserschmarrn or Palatschinken (rolled up crepes) and stalls which offer clothes and accessories. Since 1977, the market extends further along the Wienzeile to an adjacent area every Saturday, when a flea market takes place there.

The atmosphere of the Naschmarkt is famous far beyond the borders of Vienna, and large numbers of tourists visit the market every year.

See also
 Marketplace
 Retail

External links 

 Naschmarkt in Vienna
 Naschmarkt in Vienna See here a video about Vienna's biggest market.
 German-language magazine/website for the "Wiener Naschmarkt"
 German-language information website with pictures
 English-language guide to Vienna Naschmarkt
 Panoramic virtual tour in The Naschmarkt

Buildings and structures in Wieden
Buildings and structures in Mariahilf
Tourist attractions in Vienna
Retail markets in Vienna
Squares in Vienna
Retail markets in Austria
Food markets
Establishments in the Archduchy of Austria